Petru Guelfucci (6 March 1955 – 8 October 2021) was a Corsican singer.

References

External links
 
 

1955 births
2021 deaths
20th-century French male singers
People from Haute-Corse